Pridorozhny is a rural locality (a settlement) in Tatarobashmakovsky Selsoviet, Privolzhsky District, Astrakhan Oblast, Russia. The population was 164 as of 2010. There are 3 streets.

Geography 
Pridorozhny is located 36 km southwest of Nachalovo (the district's administrative centre) by road. Atal is the nearest rural locality.

References 

Rural localities in Privolzhsky District, Astrakhan Oblast